John Anthony Siason Estrada (born June 13, 1973) is a Filipino film and TV actor who has starred in a number of roles as a leading man, comedian and villain. He is a contract actor of ABS-CBN, where he remained there from 1990 to 2018 and returned on 2021, after which he transferred to GMA Network from 2018 to 2021. He also did a sitcom on TV5 called Everybody Hapi.

Early life
John Anthony Siason Estrada was born in 1973 in Quezon City, Philippines, and grew up with his family at Zamboanga City, Zamboanga del Sur where his father (Vicente Estrada) was a Municipal Councilor and his mother (Lilia Siason-Estrada) a public school teacher. At an early age, he was regularly cast in a variety of school plays and presentations, usually taking on the lead roles.

Early career
He first made his foray in show business as a model having won Bodyshots Model Search, a competition sponsored by the Fashion Designers Association of the Philippines (FDAP) early into his college years from nearby Zamboanga City to Metro Manila. However, his name gained publicity when he married actress Janice de Belen who bore him 4 children: Inah (b. 1992), Moira (b. 1993), Kaila (b. 1996), and Yuan (b. 1998).

Estrada became part of the ABS-CBN sitcom "Palibhasa Lalake" in 1990 and played minor roles in some films produced by Regal Films and Star Cinema. Soon after he shifted from acting to TV hosting via 'Sang Linggo nAPO Sila (1995-1998).  His biggest break in showbiz came in 1998 when he headlined the controversial ABS-CBN noontime show Magandang Tanghali Bayan (MTB) with Randy Santiago and Willie Revillame.  His hosting job also cost him his marriage with Janice when he was linked to his "Magandang Tanghali Bayan" co-host Vanessa del Bianco. Janice and Estrada legally separated in 2001. The marriage was officially annulled in 2004.

Recent career
In 2002, Estrada was chosen to play Boris opposite grand-slam actress Lorna Tolentino in the ABS-CBN soap Kay Tagal Kang Hinintay. His foray into dramatic acting did not alienate him from the audiences who are used to see him cracking jokes on noontime TV. He was later named Best Drama Actor in 2003 Star Awards for Television. Soon after, when ABS-CBN decided to reformat MTB following Willie Revillame's termination, Estrada offered to resign from the show so that he could concentrate on acting. He was given another lead role in another ABS-CBN soap Hiram opposite Kris Aquino and Dina Bonnevie in 2004.

However, Estrada did not stick to leading man roles after "Hiram". Instead, he tried his hand in doing villain roles in different soap operas on ABS-CBN. He returned to comedy when he accepted the role of Jim in the TV5 former sitcom Everybody Hapi with Long Mejia and Roxanne Guinoo.  Due to the sitcom's numerous casting changes, the show was reformatted to Hapi Together with Carla Humphries, Leo Martinez, Callalily lead singer Kean Cipriano and former Everybody Hapi mainstays Nova Villa & Long Mejia.  He returned to hosting for P.O.5 after 5 years since he was a former host of defunct ABS-CBN daily variety show, Magandang Tanghali Bayan, with P.O.5 co hosts Wilma , Lucy Torres-Gomez, JC De Vera, Kean Cipriano and his best friend Richard "Goma" Gomez.  Despite hosting and doing comedy for TV5, the Kapamilya Network still cast him for the inspirational drama Agua Bendita, in which he gained positive reviews.  He was given a follow-up drama, Minsan Lang Kita Iibigin where he was reunited for the third time with grandslam actress Lorna Tolentino.

He subsequently gave up his hosting stint in P.O.5 after ABS-CBN commissioned him and Randy Santiago to return to noontime TV hosting thru Happy Yipee Yehey.  He also resigned from Hapi Together where his lead role (as Geronimo) was replaced by Joey Marquez who assumed another role similar to Geronimo's character.

Estrada also earns the unofficial distinction as one of three Philippine actors that appeared as villains in both TV and movie versions of Mars Ravelo's Lastikman, along with Cherie Gil and Danilo Barrios.

In 2018, Estrada transferred to GMA Network after being with ABS-CBN for nearly 27 years, On May 2, he signed an exclusive contract with GMA Artist Center.

In August 23, 2021, Estrada returned to ABS-CBN as being the part of FPJ's Ang Probinsyano and main antagonist from FPJ's Batang Quiapo.

Personal life
Estrada is currently married to his longtime girlfriend Brazilian beauty titlist Priscilla Meirelles.

Filmography

Television

Movies
Labyu with an Accent (2022)
Fruits N' Vegetables: Mga Bulakboleros (2021) - Visitor at U.P. Campus-Diliman
The Last Interview: The Mayor Antonio Halili Story (2019)
I Love You, Hater (2018) - Richard
Unexpectedly Yours (2017) - Yael Gonzales
Tragic Theater (2015)
Trophy Wife (2014)
Boy Golden: Shoot to Kill, the Arturo Porcuna Story (2013)
Must Be... Love (2013) - King Espinosa
Ouija 2 (2012) - Ka Mano
Rosario (2010) - Jose
Villa Estrella (2009) - Dave
BFF (Best Friends Forever) (2009) - Tim/TJ
Caregiver (2008) - Teddy Gonzales
Lastikman (2004) - Taong Aso 
Pera o Bayong (Not da TV)! (2000) - Mauricio
Weder-Weder Lang 'Yan (1999) - Dodong
Ang Babae sa Bintana (1998)
Sanggano (1997) - Raymond
Hari ng Yabang (1997) - Adelbert
Calvento Files: The Movie (1997) - Pinong (Episode 2)
Best Friends (1997) - 
Sa kamay ng batas (1996)
Milyonaryong mini (1996) 
Radio Romance (1996) as Lester
Akin Ang Puri (1996)
Romano Sagrado: Talim sa dilim (1996) - Dante
Araw-araw, gabi-gabi (1995)
Buhay ng Buhay ko (1994)
Hindi magbabago (1994)
May Minamahal (1993) - Bombit
Gwapings Dos (1993) - Freddie
Guwapings: The First Adventure (1992) - Charlie
Aswang (1992)
Shotgun Banjo (1992)
Pretty Boy Hoodlum (1992)
Boy Praning Utak Pulbura (1992)
Buburahin Kita sa Mundo! (1991)
Ipaglaban Mo ako Boy Topak (1991)
Pakasalan mo ako (1991) 
Lover's Delight (1990)

Awards and nominations

References

External links

1973 births
Living people
Filipino male child actors
Filipino male television actors
Filipino male comedians
Filipino television variety show hosts
People from Quezon City
People from Isabela, Basilan
Filipino people of Spanish descent
ABS-CBN personalities
GMA Network personalities
Viva Artists Agency
Filipino male film actors
21st-century Filipino male actors